UJA-Federation of New York (United Jewish Appeal⁣ – ⁣Federation of Jewish Philanthropies of New York, Inc.) is the largest local philanthropy in the world. Headquartered in New York City, the organization raises and allocates funds annually to fulfill a mission to “care for Jews everywhere and New Yorkers of all backgrounds, respond to crises close to home and far away, and shape our Jewish future.”

UJA-Federation allocates funding to social service organizations, healthcare organizations, non-governmental organizations, Jewish institutions, and community agencies in New York, Israel, and 70 countries.

History
UJA-Federation, as it is known today, was created from the 1986 merger of the United Jewish Appeal, established in 1939, and the Federation of Jewish Philanthropies of New York, a predecessor organization established in 1917.

Both the Center for Jewish History and the American Jewish Historical Society, an affiliate of the Smithsonian, houses UJA-Federation's archives. Beginning in 1981, the Federation of Jewish Philanthropies of New York conducted an oral history project. It continued through the merger between Federation and the United Jewish Appeal of Greater New York until 2004. A collection of oral histories was published in 1995. During the late 1980s, UJA-Federation participated in the Soviet Jewry Movement with its Passage to Freedom campaign to help Jewish Émigrés from the Soviet Union.

To honor its centennial in 2017, the American Jewish Historical Society produced an exhibition exploring a timeline of UJA-Federation from 1917-2017, PBS produced a documentary for its Treasures of New York series, and a book, UJA-Federation of New York: The First Century, was published.

Funding 
In 2016, UJA-Federation's annual campaign raised $153.4 million. Including bequests, endowments, and capital and special gifts, the total amount raised in the year was $207.6 million. In 2021, UJA-Federation's annual campaign raised $63.2 million. Including bequests, endowments, and capital and special gifts, the total amount raised in 2021 was $249.6 million. UJA-Federation's endowment was $1.2 billion as of 2021.

Leadership 
Eric S. Goldstein assumed the position of CEO on July 1, 2014, replacing John S. Ruskay, Executive Vice President Emeritus. Amy A.B. Bressman was appointed president of UJA-Federation of New York on July 1, 2019; David L. Moore was appointed chair of the board. In July 2018, Rabbi Menachem Creditor assumed the position of Pearl and Ira Meyer Scholar-in-Residence of UJA-Federation. In 2021, UJA-Federation appointed former Israeli Minister of Labor, Welfare, and Social Services, Itzik Shmuli, as the Director-General of its Israel office in Jerusalem.

Notable Past Leadership of UJA-Federation

As Federation of Jewish Philanthropies of New York (1917-1986) 

 Felix M. Warburg (President, 1917-1921)
 I. Edwin Goldwasser (Executive Director, 1917-1920)
 Solomon Lowenstein (Executive Director, 1920-1935)
 Joseph L. Buttenwieser (President, 1924-1926)
 Sol M. Stroock (President, 1926-1929)
 Joseph M. Proskauer (President, 1931-1935)
 Samuel D. Leidesdorf (President, 1935-1937)
 Benjamin Buttenwieser (President, 1939-1941)
 George Z. Medalie (President, 1941-1945)
 Salim L. Lewis (President, 1954-1957)
 Gus Levy (President, 1957-1960)
 Lawrence Wien (President, 1960-1963)
 Irving Mitchell Felt (President, 1963-1966)
 Frederick P. Rose (President, 1974-1977) 
 Wilma Tisch (President, 1980-1983)

As United Jewish Appeal of Greater New York (1942-1986) 

 Sylvan Gotshal (President, 1942-1947)
 Edward Warburg (President, 1967) 
 Herbert Tenzer (President, 1972)
 Laurence Tisch (President, 1973-1974)

As UJA-Federation of New York (1986-Present) 

 Joseph Gurwin (Chair of the Board, 1988-1991)
 Larry Silverstein (Chair of the Board, 1994-1997)
 James S. Tisch (President, 1998-2001)
 John S. Ruskay (CEO, 1999-2014)
 Larry Zicklin (Chair of the Board, 2000-2001; President, 2001–2004)
 Morris W. Offit (Chair of the Board, 2001-2004; President, 2004–2007)
 Susan Stern (Chair of the Board, 2004-2007)
 Jerry W. Levin (Chair of the Board, 2007-2010; President, 2010–2013)
 Robert S. Kapito (Chair of the Board, 2016-2019)

COVID-19 Response 
In response to the COVID-19 pandemic, UJA-Federation allocated nearly $70 million in emergency grants. In 2020-21, UJA-Federation conducted an in-depth examination of the social, economic, and emotional impact of the Covid-19 pandemic on the New York Jewish community, surveying 4,400 Jews in the New York City area. The study found that nearly one in six adult Jewish New Yorkers experienced financial setbacks during the pandemic, and three-quarters of Jewish New Yorkers who said they have a substance abuse problem said it worsened during that period.

See also
 Jewish Federations of North America
 United Jewish Appeal
 Center for Jewish History
 American Jewish Historical Society
 Jews in New York City

References

Further reading
 Berkman,  Matthew.  “Transforming Philanthropy: Finance and Institutional Evolution at the Jewish Federation of New York, 1917–86,” Jewish Social Studies 22#2 (2017): 146–195.
 Berman, Lila Corwin. "How Americans Give: The Financialization of American Jewish Philanthropy" American Historical Review (2017) 122#5 pp 1459–1489. 
 Elazar, Daniel J. Community and Polity: The Organizational Dynamics of American Jewry (1995) see pp 211–18 for a listing of the community Jewish federations and the founding date.
 Feldstein, Donald "The Jewish Federation: The First Hundred Years". in Norman Linzer, ed. A portrait of the American Jewish community (1998). 
 Liebman, Charles S.  “Leadership and Decision-Making in a Jewish Federation: The New York Federation of Jewish Philanthropies,” in American Jewish Year Book (1979), 3–76.
 More,  Deborah Dash.  “From Kehillah to Federation: The Communal Functions of Federated Philanthropy in New York City, 1917–1933,” American Jewish History 68#2 (1978): 131–146;
 Nissim, Hanna Shaul Bar. "The Adaptation Process of Jewish Philanthropies to Changing Environments: The Case of the UJA-Federation of New York Since 1990." Contemporary Jewry 38.1 (2018): 79–105.
 Wenger, Beth S. “Federation Men: The Masculine World of New York Jewish Philanthropy, 1880–1945,” American Jewish History 101# 3 (2017): 377–399.

External links
 UJA-Federation of New York
 Guide to the Records of the United Jewish Appeal-Federation of New York, 1909-2004

Jewish community organizations
Jewish organizations based in New York City
Philanthropic organizations based in the United States
Soviet Jewry movement
501(c)(3) organizations
Jewish charities based in the United States